Clemmatista is a monotypic moth genus in the family Cosmopterigidae. Its single species, Clemmatista metacirrha, is found in India. Both the genus and species were first described by Edward Meyrick in 1921.

References

Cosmopteriginae